The Perfect Storm is the eighth studio album by American rapper Twista. The album was released on November 9, 2010. The album debuted with 14,939 copies at #38. As of 2014, the album has sold 61,000 copies . The album was produced mostly by The Legendary Traxster.

Singles
The first buzz single was originally scheduled to be "Ringtone" which featured additional production by Timbaland and leaked via the internet in June 2010. Because of its leak the song was scrapped as a single choice and "I Do" was released instead on July 13, 2010. The album's lead single is Make a Movie. It was released on August 24, 2010. The single originally featured R&B singer T-Pain rather than Chris Brown (both of whom made a song together), but was changed due to sample clearance.

Track listing

References

2010 albums
Albums produced by No I.D.
EMI Records albums
Twista albums
Albums produced by The Legendary Traxster